Ilya Mikhailovich Ilyin (born 10 August 1982) is a former Russian professional football player.

Club career
He made his professional debut for FC Rotor Volgograd on 5 November 2003 in the Russian Cup game against FC Anzhi Makhachkala.

He played 4 seasons in the Russian Football National League for FC Yenisey Krasnoyarsk, FC Volgar Astrakhan and FC Avangard Kursk.

External links
 
 

1982 births
Footballers from Moscow
Living people
Russian footballers
Association football goalkeepers
FC Torpedo Moscow players
FC Rotor Volgograd players
FC Rubin Kazan players
FC Asmaral Moscow players
FC Yenisey Krasnoyarsk players
FC Avangard Kursk players
FC Volgar Astrakhan players
FC Tyumen players